"I'm Old Fashioned" is a 1942 song composed by Jerome Kern, with lyrics written by Johnny Mercer.

It was written for the film You Were Never Lovelier (1942), where it was introduced by Nan Wynn who dubbed for Rita Hayworth as part of a song and dance routine with Fred Astaire.

Background
According to Mueller: "Constructed sparsely in a kind of theme and variations form (ABA'A") it is particularly notable for the appealing way the strains link up – especially for the poised and dramatic transitions between the A' and A" strains".
 
Mercer recalled working with the older Kern, and how Kern reacted to the lyrics for "I'm Old Fashioned": "We hit it off right away. I was in such awe of him, I think he must have sensed that. He was very kind to me, treated me more like a son than a collaborator. And when he thought I had a great lyric he said, 'Eva, Eva, come down here', and he kissed me on the cheek and he said, 'Eva, I want you to hear this lyric'. Well, of course I was thrilled that he liked it that much, you know. 'I'm Old Fashioned', that one was."

First recordings
The first recording was made in 1942 by Astaire with John Scott Trotter and his orchestra (Decca 18490).

Other  notable recordings
Julie Andrews
Trumpeter and singer Chet Baker recorded the song several times, at first in 1958 on the album (Chet Baker Sings) It Could Happen to You, featuring trombonist Curtis Fuller, Lee Morgan on trumpet and Kenny Drew on piano
Blossom Dearie
Dave Brubeck - Plays And Plays And Plays (1962) 
Paula Cole - Ballads (2017)
John Coltrane as a sensitive hard bop ballad in 1957 for his album Blue Train
Paul Desmond – Pure Desmond (1975)
Eileen Farrell – I've Got a Right to Sing the Blues (1960)
Ella Fitzgerald – Ella Fitzgerald Sings the Jerome Kern Songbook (1963)
Judy Garland
The Jimmy Giuffre 4 – Ad Lib (1959)
Jack Jones – Bewitched (1964)
The King Sisters
Karin Krog & Steve Kuhn - Break Of Day (2014)
Susannah McCorkle – The Songs of Johnny Mercer (1977)
Rita Reys – Swing & Sweet (1990)
Sonny Rollins – Sunny Days, Starry Nights (1984)
Dinah Shore
Margaret Whiting – Margaret Whiting Sings the Jerome Kern Songbook (1960)
Andy Williams – Danny Boy and Other Songs I Love to Sing (1962)
Cassandra Wilson – Blue Skies (1988)
The song has been predominantly interpreted by pianists like:
George Shearing, Oscar Peterson, Dave Brubeck, Jimmy Rowles, Al Haig, Ahmad Jamal, Phineas Newborn Jr., Hank Jones, Tommy Flanagan, Kenny Drew, Marian McPartland, Cedar Walton, Sadao Watanabe, McCoy Tyner, Joanne Brackeen, and Brad Mehldau.
Since the 1980s by artists like Cassandra Wilson, Maria João (both as up-tempo tunes), Stacey Kent and Victoria Williams. It was also part of the early crossover attempt by classical soprano Eileen Farrell in 1960 with her album I've Got a Right to Sing the Blues. Jessye Norman followed her example in 1984 (With a Song in My Heart'').

Popular culture
On the British tv series Are You Being Served, Mrs. Slocombe hums and sings this song in the episode The Apartment (1979).

Notes and references

1942 songs
Songs written for films
Songs with music by Jerome Kern
Songs with lyrics by Johnny Mercer
Fred Astaire songs
Ella Fitzgerald songs
Andy Williams songs